Tamzine is a historic fishing boat. Built by Brockman & Titcombe, of Margate in Kent, in south-east England, Tamzine is notable for having participated as a ''little ship' during the 1940 evacuation of the British Expeditionary Force from Dunkirk in northern France.

At  in length Tamzine was the smallest vessel to take part in the evacuation. She is clinker-built of Canadian spruce and was constructed in 1937. 
In 1965 Tamzine  participated in a twenty-fifth anniversary commemoration of the evacuation, repeating her Channel crossing. Her presence was recorded by the British newsreel Pathé News.

Tamzine was later acquired and preserved by the Imperial War Museum.

References

Collection of the Imperial War Museum
Little Ships of Dunkirk
Individual sailing vessels
Ships preserved in museums
1937 ships
Museum ships in the United Kingdom